Levantine Arabic grammar is the set of rules by which Levantine Arabic creates statements, questions and commands. In many respects, it is quite similar to that of the other vernacular Arabic varieties.

Word order 
Both VSO (verb before subject before object) and SVO (subject before verb before object) word orders are possible in Levantine. The verb is before the object (VO). However, Classical Arabic tends to prefer VSO, whereas in Levantine SVO is more common. Subject-initial order indicates topic-prominent sentences, while verb-initial order indicates subject-prominent sentences.

In interrogative sentences, the interrogative particle comes first.

Copula 
There is no copula used in the present tense in Levantine. In other tenses, the verb kān is used. Its present tense form is used in the future tense.

Definiteness 

There is no indefinite article in Levantine. Nouns (except proper nouns) are automatically indefinite by the absence of the definite article.

The Arabic definite article  precedes the noun or adjective and has multiple pronunciations. Its vowel is dropped when the preceding word ends in a vowel. A helping vowel "e" is inserted if the following word begins with a consonant cluster.

It assimilates with "Sun letters", basically all consonants that are pronounced with the tip of the tongue. Other letters are called "Moon letters". The letter Jeem is a special case. It is usually a Sun letter for speakers pronouncing it as [] but not for those pronouncing it as [].

Nouns

Case 
There is no case marking in Levantine (contrary to Classical Arabic).

Gender 
Nouns can be either masculine or feminine. In the singular, most feminine nouns end with Tāʼ marbūṭah. This is pronounced as –a or -e depending on the preceding consonant. Generally, -a after guttural and emphatic consonants, and -e after other consonants.

Number 
Nouns in Levantine can be singular, dual or plural.

The dual is invariably formed with suffix -ēn. The dual is often used in a non-exact sense, especially in temporal and spatial nouns:

For nouns referring to humans, the regular (also called sound) masculine plural is formed with the suffix -īn. The regular feminine plural is formed with -āt. The masculine plural is used to refer to a group with both gender. However, there are many broken plurals (also called internal plurals), in which the consonantal root of the singular is changed (nonconcatenative morphology). These plural patterns are shared with other varieties of Arabic and may also be applied to foreign borrowings: such as faːtuːra (plural: fwaːtiːr), from the Italian , invoice. The plural of loanwords may be sound or broken. Several patterns of broken plurals exist and it is not possible to exactly predict them.

Inanimate objects take feminine singular agreement in the plural, for verbs, attached pronouns, and adjectives.

The dual form is not used and numbers 3–10 don't lose their final vowel when followed by these nouns:
 : 1 shekel
 : 2 shekels
 : 3 shekels
 : 10 shekels

Nominal sentences 
Phrasal word order is head-dependent:
 Noun-Genitive
 Noun-Adjective
 Noun-Relative clause.

The genitive relationship is formed by putting the nouns next to each other, this construct is called Iḍāfah. The first noun is always indefinite. If an indefinite noun is added to a definite noun, it results in a new definite compound noun.

Besides possessiveness, the Iḍāfah construct can be used to specify or define the first term.

 the neighbors' house:  or 
 your radio: .

There is no limit to the number of nouns that can be strung together in an Iḍāfah. However, it is rare to have three or more words, except with very common or monosyllabic nouns.

The Iḍāfah construct is different from the noun-adjective structure. In an Iḍāfah construct, the two nouns might be different in terms of their definiteness: the first is indefinite, the second is usually definite. Whereas adjectives always agree with nouns in definiteness.

The first term must be in the construct state: if it ends in the feminine marker (/-ah/, or /-ih/), it changes to (/-at/, /-it/) in pronunciation (i.e.  pronounced as "t"). Whereas in a noun-adjective string, the pronunciation would remain (/-ah/, /-ih/).

Verbal nouns 
Verbal nouns (also called gerunds or masdar) play an important role in Levantine. Derived from a verb root, they can be used as a noun ("food") or as a gerund ("eating"). Verbal nouns do not exist as infinitives, they are not part of the verbal system but of the lexicon.

Numerals

Cardinal numbers 
Number one and two have a masculine and feminine form. When used with a noun, they rather follow it like an adjective than precede it for emphasis. An exception are uncountable nouns. When the number 2 is accompanied by a noun, the dual form is usually used: , 2 boys.

Numbers larger than 3 do not have gender but may have two forms, one used before nouns and one used independently. In particular, numbers between 3 and 10 lose their final vowel before a noun.

Numbers from 3 to 10 are followed by plural nouns. Numbers from 11 to 99 are followed by a singular.

Numbers 100 and onwards follow the same rule as numbers 0–99 based on their last two digits. 100 and 101 are followed by a singular, 102 is followed by a dual, 103–110 by a plural, and 111–199 is like 11–99, followed by a singular.

Before a small set of nouns (e.g. ("hundred") is always in construct state before nouns.

Ordinal numbers and fractions 
Ordinal numbers can either precede or follow the noun. If they precede the noun the masculine form is used and the definite article is dropped.

Ordinal numbers above 10 do not exist, instead the cardinal numbers are used following the noun.

Adjectives

Form 
Many adjectives have the pattern  ( / CCīC or  / CaCīC) but other patterns are also possible.

Adjectives derived from nouns by the suffix  are called Nisba adjectives.

Gender 
Adjectives typically have three form: a masculine singular, a feminine singular, and a plural which does not distinguish gender. In most adjectives the feminine is formed through addition of -a/e, sometimes dropping an unstressed short vowel.

Number 
Nouns in dual have adjectives in plural.

It is used with nouns referring to people. For non-human / inanimate / abstract nouns, adjectives can use either the plural or the singular feminine form regardless of the noun's gender.

Word order 
Adjectives follow the noun they modify and agree with it in definiteness. Adjectives without an article after a definite noun express a clause with the invisible copula "to be".

Superlative and comparative 
There are no separate comparative and superlative forms but the elative is used in both cases.

The elative is formed by adding a hamza at the beginning of the adjective and replace the vowels by "a" (pattern:   / aCCaC). If the second and third consonant in the root are the same, they are geminated (pattern:   / ʾaCaCC).

Speakers who pronounce  as hamza might pronounced the elative prefix as "h" in order to avoid two consecutive hamzas.

When an elative modifies a noun, it precedes the noun an no definite article is used.

In order to compare two things, the word  is used in the sense of "than" in English.

Not all adjectives can form an elative, especially those that are participles or derived from nouns. In this case,  ("more, most") is used.

Prepositions 
Prepositions must precede nominals in Levantine.

Pronouns 
Feminine plural forms modifying human females are found mostly in rural and Bedouin areas. They are not mentioned below.

Personal pronouns 
Levantine has eight persons, and therefore eight pronouns. Dual forms that exist in Modern Standard Arabic do not exist in Levantine, the plural is used instead. Because conjugated verbs indicate the subject with a prefix and/or a suffix, independent subject pronouns are usually not necessary and are mainly used for emphasis.

Independent personal pronouns

Direct object and possessive pronouns 
Direct object pronouns are indicated by suffixes attached to the conjugated verb. Their form depends whether the verb ends with a consonant or a vowel. Suffixed to nouns, these pronouns express possessive.

Indirect object pronouns 
Indirect object pronouns (dative) are suffixed to the conjugated verb. They are form by adding an ل (-l) and then the possessive suffix to the verb. They precede object pronouns if present:
 : he brought the newspaper to my father,
 : he brought it to my father,
 : he brought him the newspaper,
 : he brought him it.

Demonstrative pronouns 
Demonstrative pronouns have three referential types: immediate, proximal, and distal. The distinction between proximal and distal demonstratives is of physical, temporal, or metaphorical distance. The genderless and numberless immediate demonstrative article   is translated by "this/the", to designate something immediately visible or accessible.

Interrogative pronouns

Relative pronouns 

Verbs

Root 
Like Arabic verbs, most Levantine verbs are based on a triliteral root (also called radical) made of three consonants (therefore also called triconsonantal root). The set of consonants communicates the basic meaning of a verb, e.g. k-t-b 'write', q-r-’ 'read', ’-k-l 'eat'. Changes to the vowels in between the consonants, along with prefixes or suffixes, specify grammatical functions such as tense, person and number, in addition to changes in the meaning of the verb that embody grammatical concepts such as mood (e.g. indicative, subjunctive, imperative), voice (active or passive), and functions such as causative, intensive, or reflexive.

Quadriliteral roots are less common, but often used to coin new vocabulary or to Arabicize foreign words.

The base form is the third-person masculine singular of the perfect (also called past) tense.

Verb forms 

Almost all Levantine verbs can be categorized in one of ten verb forms (also called verb measures, stems, patterns, or types). Form I, the most common one, serves as a base for the other nine forms. Each form carries a different verbal idea, relative to the meaning of its root. Technically, 10 verbs can be constructed from any given triconsonantal root. However, all of those ten forms may not be used in practice by speakers. After Form I, Forms II, V, VII, and X are the most common ones.

Aldrich also defines verb forms XI (for verbs based on quadriliteral roots) and XII (for passive or intransitive version of form XI verbs).

In addition to its form, each verb has a "quality":
 Sound (or regular): 3 distinct radicals, neither the second nor the third is w or y,
 Verbs containing the radicals w or y are called weak. They can be either:
 Hollow: verbs with w or y as the second radical, which can become a long a in some forms, or
 Defective: verbs with w or y as the third radical, treated as a vowel,
 Geminate (or doubled): the second and third radicals are identical, remaining together as a double consonant.

Some irregular verbs do not fit into any of the verb forms.

The initial i in verb forms VII, VIII, IX, X drops when the preceding word ends in a vowel or at the beginning of a sentence.

Regular verb conjugation 
The Levantine verb has only two tenses: past (perfect) and present (also called imperfect, b-imperfect, or bi-imperfect). The future tense is an extension of the present tense. The negative imperative is the same as the negative present with helping verb (imperfect). The grammatical person and number as well as the mood are designated by a variety of prefixes and suffixes. The following table shows the paradigm of a sound Form I verb,  'to write'.

The b-imperfect is usually used for the indicative mood (non-past present, habitual/general present, narrative present, planned future actions, or potential). The prefix b- is deleted in the subjunctive mood, usually after various modal verbs, auxiliary verbs, pseudo-verbs, prepositions, and particles.

In the following table, the accented vowel is in bold.

In the perfect tense, the first person singular and second person masculine singular are identical. For regular verbs, the third-person feminine singular is written identically but stressed differently.

Depending on regions and accents, the -u can be pronounced -o and the -i can be pronounced -é.

In Southern Levantine dialects, the vowel of the suffix in past tense 3rd person feminine as well as the prefix in the present tense 1st person singular is "a" instead of "i". It might be "u" in other persons of the present tense due to vowel harmony.

Active participle 
The active participle, also called present participle, is grammatically an adjective derived from a verb. Depending on the context, it can express the present or present continuous (with verbs of motion, location, or mental state), the near future, or the present perfect (past action with a present result). It can also serve as a noun or an adjective.

The active participle can be inflected from the verb based on its verb form.

Passive participle 
The passive participle, also called past participle, has a similar meaning as in English (i.e. sent, written, etc.). It is mostly used as an adjective but it can sometimes be used as a noun. It is inflected from the verb based on its verb form. However, in practice, passive participles are largely limited to verb forms I (CvCvC) and II (CvCCvC), becoming maCCūC for the former and mCaCCaC for the latter.

Future 
There are various ways to express the future. One is by using the present tense (with b- prefix) on its own. Another one is by using .

The future tense is formed with the imperfect preceded by the particle  or by the prefixed particle .

Present continuous 
The present continuous is formed with the progressive particle  followed by the imperfect, with or without the initial b/m depending on the speaker.

It is also common to use the b- prefix only in those forms starting with a vowel (e.g. 1st person singular).

Helping verbs 
After helping verbs (may also be called modal verbs, pseudo-verbs, auxiliary verbs, or prepositional phrases) the imperfect form (also called subjunctive) is used, that is, the form without the initial b/m.

Compound tenses 
The verb  can be followed by another verb, forming compound tenses. Both verbs are conjugated with their subject.

Passive voice 
Form I verbs often correspond to an equivalent passive form VII verb, with the prefix n-. Form II and form III verbs usually correspond to an equivalent passive on forms V and VI, respectively, with the prefix t-.

While the verb forms V, VI and VII are common in the simple past and compound tenses, the passive participle (past participle) is preferred in the present tense.

To have 
Levantine does not have a verb "to have". The past indicator ken and the future indicator raH are used to express possession in the past or the future, respectively.

To want 
Enclitic personal pronouns are suffixed directly to the pseudo-verb  (North:  / South) to express "to want".

Adverbs 
Levant does not distinguish between adverbs and adjectives in adverbial function. Almost any adjective can be used as an adverb:  (‘good’) vs.  (‘Did you sleep well?’) Adverbs from MSA, showing the suffix -an, are often used, e.g.  (‘at all’). Adverbs often appear after the verb or the adjective.  (‘very’) can be positioned after or before the adjective.

Adverbs of manner can usually be formed using bi- followed by the nominal form:  (‘fast, quickly’).

Negation 
  and   mean “no.”

Verbs and prepositional phrases can be negated by the particle   either on its own or, in South Levantine, together with the suffix   at the end of the verb or prepositional phrase. In Palestinian, it is also common to negate verbs by the suffix   only.

  or in Syrian Arabic   negates adjectives (including active participles), demonstratives, and nominal phrases.

Negative copula 

Subordination 
Relative clauses are formed with the particle yalli/illi/halli (the one who) when definite things are being described. It can be used either for people (who) or objects (that, which).

If the noun to which the relative pronoun refers is indefinite and non specific, the relative clause is linked without any coordinating conjunction and is indistinguishable from an independent sentence.

In formal speech, sentence complements can be introduced with the particle ʔǝnn ("that"), to which some speakers attach a personal pronoun (o or i).

For circumstantial clauses, the conjunction w- introduces subordinate clauses with the sense "while, when, with".

Conjunctions

Notes

References

Sources

External links 

 

Grammar
Semitic grammars